The 1953 LFF Lyga was the 32nd season of the LFF Lyga football competition in Lithuania.  It was contested by 13 teams, and Elnias Šiauliai won the championship.

League standings

References
RSSSF

LFF Lyga seasons
1953 in Lithuania
LFF